The Global Run: Alay sa Pilipino at sa Buong Mundo (English:Global Run: A Tribute to All Filipinos around the Globe) is a fund raising run started by Filipino runner Cesar Guarin. The run is consist of 14 stages encompassing all continents but Antarctica and South America. The run is set to be completed by 2016. If successful, Cesar Guarin will be the first Filipino, first Asian and fourth person to run around the world

Completed Stages

Ongoing Stage

Planned Stages

External links
Global Ran Official Website 
Facebook page

References

Multiday races
Charity events